Florida State Museum may refer to:

 Florida Museum of Natural History, Gainesville
 Museum of Florida History, Tallahassee
 John and Mable Ringling Museum of Art, the Florida state museum of art, Sarasota
 T. T. Wentworth, Jr. Florida State Museum, Pensacola